The Golden Globe Award for Best Actor – Television Series Drama is an award presented annually by the Hollywood Foreign Press Association (HFPA). This Golden Globe Award honors the best performance by an actor in a drama television series. It was first awarded at the 19th Golden Globe Awards on March 5, 1962 to John Charles Daly and Bob Newhart under the title "Best TV Star – Male". In 1969, the award was presented under the new title "Best TV Actor – Drama"; its current title has been used since 1980. The nominees for the award have been announced annually since 1963.

Kevin Costner is the current recipient of the award for his portrayal of John Dutton in Yellowstone. Ed Asner, John Forsythe, Jon Hamm, Hugh Laurie and Telly Savalas have won the most awards in this category, each winning twice. Peter Falk and Tom Selleck have both been nominated seven times each, for their respective roles on Columbo and Magnum, P.I..

Winners and nominees
Listed below are the winners of the award for each year, as well as the other nominees.

1960s

1970s

Best Actor – Television Series Drama

1980s

1990s

2000s

2010s

2020s

Superlatives

Multiple wins

Multiple nominations

See also
 Primetime Emmy Award for Outstanding Lead Actor in a Drama Series
 Screen Actors Guild Award for Outstanding Performance by a Male Actor in a Drama Series

References

Golden Globe Awards
 
Television awards for Best Actor